Northeast India International Travel Mart (NEITM or ITM) is a tourism event to showcase the Northeastern region of India, which is popularly known as North East (NE). This event is organised by Ministry of Tourism, Govt. of India in association with hosting State Govts. and other States of the region. The regional states are Arunachal Pradesh, Assam, Manipur, Meghalaya, Mizoram, Nagaland, Sikkim, Tripura and West Bengal. One of the 9 states hosts the event annually. ITM had taken the first step at Haru Hojai Stadium, Guwahati in January 2013 , thereafter 3 states hosted the event. This year  Assam hosts for the  2nd time, the 3-day event at Taj Vivanta Hotel, Guwahati from 5 to 7 December 2017.

Events

Fam Tour
After the main event, each states organise Fam Tours & Cultural Evenings for guests to get first hand experience in Northeast India.

See also
 Incredible India
 Assam TDCL

References

External links
 ITM website

Tourism in Northeast India
Tourism marketing
2013 establishments in India
Recurring events established in 2013